Knox Township, Ohio, may refer to:

Knox Township, Columbiana County, Ohio
Knox Township, Guernsey County, Ohio
Knox Township, Holmes County, Ohio
Knox Township, Jefferson County, Ohio
Knox Township, Vinton County, Ohio

Ohio township disambiguation pages